The Slovenian Basketball Supercup is a men’s professional basketball super cup competition in Slovenia, and it is played between the champion of the top-tier Slovenian National League and the winner of the Slovenian Basketball Cup.

Games

Performance by club

See also
Slovenian Premier A League
Slovenian Cup

References

External links
Official website 

Supercup
Basketball supercup competitions in Europe
Recurring sporting events established in 2003
2003 establishments in Slovenia